Karl Stollery (born November 21, 1987) is a Canadian former professional ice hockey defenceman. He most recently played with HC Bolzano, Italian team of the ICE Hockey League (ICEHL).

Playing career
Stollery played minor junior hockey in his hometown for the Camrose Kodiaks of the Alberta Junior Hockey League. In his four seasons with the Kodiaks from 2004 to 2008, Stollery helped clinch the championship and Doyle Cup on three occasions and was a two-time AJHL South All-Star, captaining in his second appearance.

Stollery committed to a collegiate career, with Merrimack College of the Hockey East. In his freshman season in 2008–09, he played in all 34 games and led the defence in scoring with 16 points to be the lone defenceman named to the Hockey East All-Rookie team. In addition to his impact on the ice, Stollery was selected to the Hockey East All-Academic Team. He followed up in his Sophomore season, by again leading the defence in scoring and appearing in every game for the Warriors. With a second consecutive All-Academic berth, an undrafted Stollery showed his offensive ability and also a surprising physical all-round game, to be invited to the Atlanta Thrashers NHL rookie camp.

As a Junior, Stollery produced a career high 27 points during the 2010–11 season, placing second among Hockey East defencemen and earning a selection to the HE All-Tournament Team and All-Conference honourable mention. He was subsequently announced as Merrimack's captain for his senior year prior to the 2011–12 season. With 21 points in 37 games and a place in the Hockey East Second All-Star team, Stollery completed his career as the Warriors leading defensive scorer in each year. Having never missed a collegiate game, Stollery also became Merrimack's All-time leader in games played with 145.

Upon the conclusion of his collegiate career, Stollery was signed to an amateur try-out contract with the Lake Erie Monsters of the American Hockey League on March 24, 2012. He tallied his first professional goal in his third game on March 29, in a 4–3 shoot-out victory over the Houston Aeros and appeared in the final 9 games of Lake Erie's season to score 7 points. With his offensive ability able to show through on the powerplay he was then signed to a one-year AHL contract with the Monsters for the following season.

During the 2012–13 season, Stollery became a fixture on the Monsters blueline. In anchoring the defence, he led the team with 34 points in 72 games, and was signed to a one-year contract with NHL parent affiliate, the Colorado Avalanche, at season's end.

After playing in five scoreless games with Colorado during the 2014–15 season, on March 2, 2015, Stollery was traded by the Avalanche to the San Jose Sharks in exchange for Freddie Hamilton. He was initially assigned to AHL affiliate, the Worcester Sharks, before he was recalled to make his Sharks debut on April 3, 2015, against the Arizona Coyotes. He completed the season with the out-of-contention Sharks playing in the final stretch before he was returned to Worcester for the playoffs.

On June 27, 2015, Stollery was re-signed to a one-year contract to remain with the San Jose Sharks. In the 2015–16 season, Stollery was unable to add to his NHL experience, as he was assigned to new AHL affiliate, the San Jose Barracuda, for the duration of the year.

On July 1, 2016, Stollery signed as a free agent to a one-year, two-way deal with the New Jersey Devils. After starting the 2016-17 season, with the Albany Devils of the AHL, Stollery was recalled and appeared in a career best 11 games with the Devils, recording 3 assists.

On June 14, 2017, as an impending free agent, Stollery left North America in signing a one-year deal with Latvian club, Dinamo Riga of the KHL. After a successful first season in Latvia, scoring 14 points in 53 games for the 2017–18 season, Stollery left Riga as a free agent in the off-season and agreed to a one-year deal to continue in the KHL with Finnish outfit, Jokerit, on August 17, 2018.

On May 14, 2019, Stollery left the KHL as a free agent and extended his European career by agreeing to a one-year deal with Swedish club, Frölunda HC of the SHL.

In January 2021 Stollery signed a half year contract with the Italian ICE Hockey League team of HC Bolzano.

International play

During the 2017–18 season, Stollery was selected to represent Canada at the 2018 Winter Olympics in Pyeongchang, South Korea. Used in an bottom pairing role, he featured in four games to help Canada claim the bronze medal.

Career statistics

Regular season and playoffs

International

Awards and honours

References

External links
 

1987 births
Albany Devils players
Bolzano HC players
Camrose Kodiaks players
Canadian expatriate ice hockey players in Finland
Canadian expatriate ice hockey players in Latvia
Canadian expatriate ice hockey players in Sweden
Canadian ice hockey defencemen
Colorado Avalanche players
Dinamo Riga players
Frölunda HC players
Ice hockey people from Alberta
Ice hockey players at the 2018 Winter Olympics
Jokerit players
Lake Erie Monsters players
Living people
Medalists at the 2018 Winter Olympics
Merrimack Warriors men's ice hockey players
New Jersey Devils players
Olympic bronze medalists for Canada
Olympic ice hockey players of Canada
Olympic medalists in ice hockey
People from Camrose, Alberta
San Jose Barracuda players
San Jose Sharks players
Undrafted National Hockey League players
Worcester Sharks players